Gap Band 8 is the 10th album (contrary to the title) by American R&B and funk band the Gap Band, released in 1986 on Total Experience Records. It is the first (and only) album in the band's self-titled series to be subtitled with a regular number instead of a Roman numeral, as well as their final self-titled album.

The album includes the singles "Big Fun", "How Music Came About" and "Zibble, Zibble (Get the Money)" (also known as "Get Loose, Get Funky"). The album was expanded and remastered in 2011 by Big Break Records including 6 additional bonus tracks.

Track listing

(*) Bonus tracks on the remastered version

References
[ Allmusic]
Discogs

External links
 
 Gap Band 8 at Discogs
 Facebook Page
 Myspace Page
 Encyclopedia of Oklahoma History and Culture - Gap Band
 The Gap Band at WhoSampled
 Charlie Wilson in-depth interview by Pete Lewis, 'Blues & Soul' August 2011
 Charlie Wilson 2011 Interview at Soulinterviews.com

1986 albums
The Gap Band albums
Total Experience Records albums
Albums recorded at Total Experience Recording Studios